This is the list of chain-branded hotels around the world. This is a listing of some of the major hotel brands worldwide. The hotel groups may directly own the hotels, or operate them through a franchise or management agreement.

Table

See also

 Lists of hotels – index of hotel list articles on Wikipedia
 List of defunct hotel chains

References

Hotels
Chains